The 2022 Liga 1 U-14  was the first season of the Liga 1 Elite Pro Academy U-14. The league is currently the youth level (U-14) football league in Indonesia. The season started on 4 September.

18 teams divided into 3 groups

Group stage

Group A

Group B

Group C

Ranking of runner-up

Knockout stage

Semi-finals

Third place

Final

Awards 
 Top goalscorers: Hafiz Shihabbiun Syakib (Bhayangkara U14s) (6 goals)
 Best player: Mochammad Mierza Firjatullah (Dewa United U14s)
 Best referee: Faizal Nazaruddin
 Best coach: Heriansyah (Dewa United U14s) 
 Best academy: Persib U14s
 Fair-play team: Persis U14s

See also 
2022 Liga 1 U-16
2022 Liga 1 U-18

References 

EPA U-14 2022
Sport in Indonesia